Lars Rørbakken(born 17 July 1979) is a strongman and armwrestler from Trengereid outside Bergen, Norway.

Armwrestling

References

External links 
 Norway's second strongest man 2011
 Norwegian record 245 kilo stone
  402,5 kg deadlift

Norwegian strength athletes
1979 births
Living people